The 1920 St. Louis Cardinals season was the team's 39th season in St. Louis, Missouri and the 29th season in the National League. The Cardinals went 75–79 during the season and finished 5th in the National League.

Regular season 
Rogers Hornsby became a full-time second baseman. Hornsby won the first of his seven batting titles with a .370 batting average, and he also led the league in on-base percentage (.431), slugging percentage (.559), hits (218), total bases (329), doubles (44), and RBI (94). From a fielding perspective, Hornsby led the league in putouts, assists, and double plays.

Season standings

Record vs. opponents

Roster

Player stats

Batting

Starters by position 
Note: Pos = Position; G = Games played; AB = At bats; H = Hits; Avg. = Batting average; HR = Home runs; RBI = Runs batted in

Other batters 
Note: G = Games played; AB = At bats; H = Hits; Avg. = Batting average; HR = Home runs; RBI = Runs batted in

Pitching

Starting pitchers 
Note: G = Games pitched; IP = Innings pitched; W = Wins; L = Losses; ERA = Earned run average; SO = Strikeouts

Other pitchers 
Note: G = Games pitched; IP = Innings pitched; W = Wins; L = Losses; ERA = Earned run average; SO = Strikeouts

Relief pitchers 
Note: G = Games pitched; W = Wins; L = Losses; SV = Saves; ERA = Earned run average; SO = Strikeouts

Farm system 
 Class B: Houston Buffaloes (Texas League; Jewel Ens, manager)
 Class D: Fort Smith Twins (Western Association; Boss Schmidt, manager)

References

External links
1920 St. Louis Cardinals season at Baseball Reference
1920 St. Louis Cardinals team page at www.baseball-almanac.com

St. Louis Cardinals seasons
Saint Louis Cardinals season
St Louis